Bridges No. L-5853 and 92247 are two side-by-side bridges in Saint Paul, Minnesota, United States. They were built in 1904 over the Como-Harriet streetcar line, connecting the nearby Twin City Rapid Transit Company station to the line running west to Minneapolis; Bridge No. 92247 carries traffic on Lexington Avenue over the tracks and Bridge No. L-5853 carried pedestrians; the latter is an example of an early reinforced concrete arch bridge, using the Melan reinforcing system by the William S. Hewett & Company of Minneapolis.

The bridges were evaluated as part of the Reinforced-Concrete Highway Bridges in Minnesota MPS and were listed on the National Register of Historic Places in 1989.

References

See also
 Interlachen Bridge in Minneapolis, Minnesota, built by the same engineer and also using the Melan reinforcing system

Arch bridges in the United States
Bridges completed in 1904
Bridges in Saint Paul, Minnesota
Bridges on the National Register of Historic Places in Minnesota
Concrete bridges in the United States
National Register of Historic Places in Saint Paul, Minnesota
Open-spandrel deck arch bridges in the United States
Pedestrian bridges in Minnesota
Pedestrian bridges on the National Register of Historic Places
Road bridges on the National Register of Historic Places in Minnesota